Dean D. Schrempp (born July 4, 1935, in Dupree, South Dakota) is an American politician and a Democratic member of the South Dakota House of Representatives representing District 28A since January 2009. Schrempp was non-consecutively a member from January 1993 until January 1995 and from January 1997 until January 1999.

Elections
2012 Schrempp was unopposed for both the June 5, 2012 Democratic primary and the November 6, 2012 General election, winning with 2,657 votes.
1992 Under a new district system, Schrempp won the District 28A June 2, 1992 Democratic primary with 542 votes (53.4%), and won the November 3, 1992 General election with 1,564 votes (55.34%) against Republican nominee Vince Dahlgren.
1994 Schrempp was challenged in the June 7, 1994 Democratic primary and lost to Mark Van Norman; Van Norman lost the November 8, 1994 General election to Republican nominee Eric Bogue.
1996 Schrempp and incumbent Republican representative Eric Bogue were unopposed for their primaries, Schrempp won the November 5, 1996 General election with by 76 votes with 1,762 votes (51.1%) against Representative Bogue.
1998 When William Johnson left the South Dakota Senate District 28 seat open, Schrempp and former Republican representative Bogue were unopposed for their primaries; in the November 3, 1998 General election Schrempp lost to Representative Bogue.
2000 Schrempp and incumbent Republican senator Bogue were unopposed for their 2000 primaries, setting up a rematch; in the November 7, 2000 General election Schrempp again lost to Senator Bogue.
2004 To challenge incumbent Republican senator Bogue again, Schrempp won the June 1, 2004 Democratic primary by 90 votes with 1,075 votes (52.2%) but lost the November 2, 2004 General election to Senator Bogue/
2008 When District 28A incumbent Democratic representatives Tom Van Norman was term limited and left the seat open, Schrempp won the June 3, 2008 Democratic primary with 878 votes (66.1%), and won the four-way November 4, 2008 General election with 1,673 votes (49.1%) ahead of Republican nominee Everett Hunt and Independent candidates Ira Blue Coat and Manny Iron Hawk; Hunt had been the Republican nominee in 2004 and 2006.
2010 Schrempp was challenged by former representative Tom Van Norman in the June 8, 2010 Democratic primary; Schrempp won with 462 votes (65%), and was unopposed for the November 2, 2010 General election, winning with 1,849 votes.

References

External links
Official page at the South Dakota Legislature
 

1935 births
Living people
Democratic Party members of the South Dakota House of Representatives
People from Dewey County, South Dakota
People from Ziebach County, South Dakota
21st-century American politicians